Pachyhalictus karunaratnei is a species of bee in the genus Pachyhalictus, of the family Halictidae. It is endemic to Sri Lanka, specimen was first found from Kalutara district.

External links
 Atlashymenoptera.net
 Eol.org
 Academia.edu
 Collections.si.edu
 Cea.lk

Halictidae
Hymenoptera of Asia
Insects of Sri Lanka
Insects described in 1911